Jai Krishna was an eminent civil engineer from India with specialisation in earthquake engineering. He served University of Roorkee  for many years and rose to become its Vice Chancellor.

Early life 
Jai Krishna was born on 27 January 1912  at Muzaffarnagar, in the United Provinces of Agra and Oudh. He got Bachelor in Science degree from Agra college and then studied engineering at Thomason College of Civil Engineering (now Indian Institute of Technology Roorkee ) passing with honours in 1935. As a student Jai Krishna won awards like Thomason Prize, Cautley Gold Medal and Calcott Reilly Memorial Gold Medal. He received  his Doctoral Degree in Civil Engineering from University of London.

Jai Krishna joined Thomason College of Civil Engineering in 1939 as Lecturer and became Professor and the Vice Chancellor in 1969.

Contribution 
Starting of a teaching and research program in Earthquake Engineering at University of Roorkee in 1945
Introducing courses on Soil Mechanics in 1948 and on Structural Dynamics in 1945
Formulation of Indian Standards for Earthquake Resistant Design of Structures that was brought out by the Indian Standards Institution (now Bureau of Indian Standards).
Developed earthquake resistant design of a large number of major and important engineering projects in India.
Initiated work on design, fabrication and installation of structural response recorders and accelerographs in India to collect data.
Set up the School of Research and Training in Earthquake Engineering, at University of Roorkee.

Awards 
Bhatnagar Award of CSIR 1966,
National Design Award (1956) of the Institution of Engineers (India),
Moudgil Award of Indian Standards Institution (1945),
International Award of Japan Society of Disaster Prevention (1958) and
award for lifetime contributions in Earthquake Engineering by Indian National Academy of Engineering (1955)
Padma Bhushan in 1972
Jai Krishna was awarded Honorary Degrees of Doctorate by Agra University and the University of Roorkee.

Professional fellowships 
He was a Fellow of many professional bodies and academies including:
Indian National Science Academy,
Indian National Academy of Engineering,
Institution of Engineers (India),
National Academy of Engineering,
Third World Academy of Sciences and
International Association of Earthquake Engineering — President during the period 1977-1980.
Indian National Academy of Engineering- its founder President.

He died on 27 August 1999 in Roorkee.

References 

1912 births
1999 deaths
Recipients of the Padma Bhushan in civil service
Indian civil engineers
Recipients of the Shanti Swarup Bhatnagar Award in Engineering Science
People from Muzaffarnagar
Indian ethnologists
Members of the United States National Academy of Engineering
Engineers from Uttar Pradesh
20th-century Indian engineers
Fellows of the Indian National Academy of Engineering